Santa Elisabetta (Sicilian: Sabbetta) is a small town (municipality) in the Province of Agrigento in the Italian region Sicily, located about  south of Palermo and about  north of Agrigento.

Santa Elisabetta borders the following municipalities: Aragona, Joppolo Giancaxio, Raffadali, Sant'Angelo Muxaro.

References

External links
Official website

Cities and towns in Sicily